Nudamphiura is a genus of echinoderms. Nudamphiura was described by Luiz Roberto Tommasi in 1965.

References

Amphiuridae
Ophiuroidea genera